Michael Charles Stern (born 3 August 1942) is a British Conservative Party politician. Stern contested Derby South at the 1979 general election before being elected as Member of Parliament (MP) for Bristol North West at the 1983 general election.  He represented the seat for 14 years. In the 1992 election, he held on by the extremely narrow margin of 45 votes, but in 1997 — unhelped by adverse boundary changes — lost the seat to Labour's Doug Naysmith by 11,382 votes.

References

Times Guide to the House of Commons, 1992 and 1997 editions

External links 
 

Living people
1942 births
Conservative Party (UK) MPs for English constituencies
UK MPs 1983–1987
UK MPs 1987–1992
UK MPs 1992–1997
Members of the Bow Group
People educated at Christ's College, Finchley